Mary Montagu Douglas Scott, Duchess of Buccleuch and Queensberry (17 September 1900 – 9 February 1993), was the elder of the two daughters of Maj. William Frank Lascelles, the son of diplomat Frank Lascelles (23 March 1841 – 2 January 1920). Her mother was Lady Sybil Evelyn de Vere Beauclerk, daughter of William Beauclerk, 10th Duke of St Albans, and his first wife, Sybil Mary Grey (28 November 1848 – 7 September 1871). Through her father, Mary was descended from Charles Beauclerk, 1st Duke of St Albans (1670–1726), illegitimate son of King Charles II of England and his mistress Nell Gwynn.

On 21 April 1921, she married Walter Montagu Douglas Scott, 8th Duke of Buccleuch and 10th Duke of Queensberry; she was styled "Duchess of Buccleuch" from 19 October 1935. They had three children:
Lady Elizabeth Diana Montagu Douglas Scott (20 January 1922 – 19 September 2012)
Walter Francis John Montagu Douglas Scott, 9th Duke of Buccleuch and 11th Duke of Queensberry  (28 September 1923 – 4 September 2007)
Lady Caroline Margaret Montagu Douglas Scott ( 1927- 2004 )

The Duchess died aged 92 at Boughton House on 9 February 1993. She was buried next to her husband among the ruins of Melrose Abbey.

External links
Photograph of Mary Lascelles (dated 1 March 1921, a month and a half before her marriage)
Biographical entry at thepeerage.com
Descendants of the 8th Duke & Duchess of Buccleuch

1900 births
1993 deaths
British duchesses by marriage
Burials at Melrose Abbey